William Henderson (February 26, 1837 – September 24, 1931) was a Scottish-born architect who mainly worked in Canada.  He was the Resident Architect for the Department of Public Works in British Columbia.

Life and career 
Henderson was born in Lonmay, Aberdeenshire, to a family of architects.  He became a stone cutter at the age of 13, and in 1857, he emigrated to Canada.  In 1861 he moved back to Scotland, where he married his first wife.  They had three children together, including Stuart Alexander Henderson and Gordon Smith Henderson.

In 1872 he moved back to Canada as an overseer for the Federal department of public works in Canada.  Henderson remained In government until 1887, when he started his own general construction business.  During this time, he completed independent commissions for new buildings in Regina and Qu'Appelle.  In 1896 he was appointed Resident Architect for the Territories and, in  June 1897, became Resident Architect for the Dept. of Public Works for British Columbia.  This position meant he was responsible as site supervisor for all federal buildings being built in the province.  He retired in 1925 and died in 1931.  In public life, he was an alderman at Oak Bay from 1906–08 and was the Grand Master of the Masonic Lodge British Columbia in 1913.  A biographer described Henderson as " highly respected and admired, and his record in public life, as well as his efforts in behalf of all movements tending towards the moral uplift of the community, places him in the foremost rank of Victoria's estimable citizens." Henderson Hall and Henderson road in Oak Bay were both named for him.

Structures

Independent

Government

References 

1837 births
1931 deaths
Architects by nationality
19th-century Scottish architects
People from Aberdeen